I Was a Prisoner on Devil's Island is a 1941 American crime film directed by Lew Landers and written by Karl Brown. The film stars Sally Eilers, Donald Woods, Eduardo Ciannelli, Victor Kilian, Charles Halton and Dick Curtis. The film was released on August 4, 1941, by Columbia Pictures.

Plot
Dr. Martel is the new physician at the notorious Devil's Island prison. He's in a loveless arranged marriage with Claire. Joel, sentenced to three years on Devil's Island for manslaughter, is in love with Claire. Joel is befriended by prison guard Guissart after the guard learns they both served in the French Foreign Legion. Joel's foot is almost amputated after he purposefully injures it in an attempt to get closer to Claire.

The corrupt prison Commandant and Dr. Martel steal a shipment of critical "jungle fever" vaccine and sell it on the black market, only to have the disease strike the prison and sicken Claire. Joel escapes Devil's Island and sails to the mainland to get the vaccine back. Guissart sends a telegram to the Governor on the mainland, requesting Joel's pardon for saving everyone. The Governor agrees to visit the prison, and the Commandant realizes he must kill Guissart or have all his crimes exposed. When Joel, Claire, and Guissart try to flee, the prison guards begin shooting. Dr. Martel and the Commandant, realizing Guissart is free, also try to leave the prison, only to be gunned down. The Governor grants Joel a pardon, and he, Claire, and Guissart leave Devil's Island.

Cast          
Sally Eilers as Claire Martel
Donald Woods as Joel Grant / Joseph Elmer
Eduardo Ciannelli as Dr. Victor Martel
Victor Kilian as Guissart
Charles Halton as Commandant
Dick Curtis as Jules
John Tyrrell as Gerault
Eddie Laughton as Brisson
Edmund Cobb as Quarry Guard
Robert Warwick as Governor

References

External links
 

1941 films
American crime films
1941 crime films
Columbia Pictures films
Films directed by Lew Landers
American black-and-white films
1940s English-language films
1940s American films